Hourican is an Irish surname. Notable people with the surname include:

 John Hourican (born 1970), Irish banker
 Liam Hourican, Irish actor

References 

Surnames of Irish origin
Anglicised Irish-language surnames